Danleigh Borman (born 27 January 1985 in Cape Town) is a South African footballer who plays as a defender.

Career

College and amateur
Borman began his career in the youth system of South African Premier Soccer League side Santos, before moving to the United States in 2004 to play college soccer at the University of Rhode Island. He was named A-10 Rookie of the Year in 2004, finishing with two goals and five assists. He earned the A-10 Championship Most Outstanding Player Award after helping the Rams to a 2–0 win over St. Louis University in the 2006 Championship Game, and was selected to the Atlantic 10 All-Conference second team in 2007 after finishing his senior season with one goal and seven assists. Borman totalled seven goals and 16 assists in 83 games in his four seasons with Rhode Island.

During the 2006 and 2007 season Borman also played for the Rhode Island Stingrays in the USL Premier Development League. In 2006, he led the Stingrays with seven goals, including a hat-trick in a 6–0 victory over the Vermont Voltage on 2 July 2006.

Professional
Borman was drafted with the 7th overall pick in the 2008 MLS Supplemental Draft by New York Red Bulls. He made his professional debut on 5 April 2008, coming on as a half time substitute against Columbus Crew. He scored his first Major League Soccer goal against the Los Angeles Galaxy on 10 May 2008, and ended his first season in MLS appearing in 15 matches and scoring two goals. In 2009 Borman saw action in both midfield and as a left back. He ended the season as the club's starting left back, appearing in 24 league matches and scoring one goal. At the conclusion of the MLS season, Borman went on a training stint with Argentine side Gimnasia La Plata.

Borman was traded to Toronto FC on 1 April 2011 along with teammate Tony Tchani and a 2012 SuperDraft 1st round draft pick for Dwayne De Rosario. The following day Borman made his debut for Toronto in a 1–1 home draw against Chivas USA.

After the 2011 season, Toronto and Borman could not agree terms and Borman opted to participate in the 2011 MLS Re-Entry Draft. He was selected by New England Revolution in Stage 1 of the draft on 5 December 2011. New England and Borman never came to terms though, and he subsequently signed for ABSA Premiership side SuperSport United. Borman was released by SuperSport United at the end of the 2012-13 Premier Soccer League season.

He joined Mpumalanga Black Aces in September 2013 on a 1-year deal.

Borman signed with Vasco da Gama (South Africa) in August 2014.

International
Borman has represented South Africa at the U-20 level, initially being called up at the age of seventeen.

Honours

New York Red Bulls
Major League Soccer Eastern Conference Championship: 2008

Toronto FC
 Canadian Championship: 2011

SuperSport United
 Nedbank Cup: 2012

Career statistics
Updated 6 July 2010

Last Update: 1 October 2011

1Lamar Hunt U.S. Open Cup/Nutrilite Canadian Cup

References

External links

infosportinc.com

1985 births
Living people
Association football midfielders
Sportspeople from Cape Town
Rhode Island Stingrays players
New York Red Bulls players
Toronto FC players
SuperSport United F.C. players
Expatriate soccer players in the United States
Expatriate soccer players in Canada
South African soccer players
Cape Coloureds
USL League Two players
Major League Soccer players
Rhode Island Rams men's soccer players
New York Red Bulls draft picks